Hazmieh (also Romanized as Hazmiyé, Hazmie, Hasmiyeh, Al Ḩāzimīyah, and El Hâzmîyé) is a town in Mount Lebanon Governorate of Lebanon, and a suburb of Beirut, part of Greater Beirut.

Geography

Hazmieh covers an area of 2.73 square kilometers directly southeast of Beirut, at an elevation of between 50–200 meters above sea level. Its borders are defined by the Beirut River and Sin El Fil Boulevard to the north, Camille Chamoun Boulevard to the west, by El Sayad Roundabout and Rihaniyya Junction to the south, and a military school to the east.

History

Hazmieh, along with other suburbs to the east of Beirut, has historically been a predominantly Christian area.

In 2002, warlord Elie Hobeika was assassinated along with three bodyguards in an explosion in Hazmieh. Hobeika had commanded troops in the Sabra and Shatila massacre in 1982. Another bombing in 2008 killed a Lebanese intelligence official who had been investigating militant groups in the country.

Name
According to Anis Fraiha in his book Names of Lebanese Cities and Villages, the name Hazmieh comes from two Aramaic words: "haza" which translates as "watch," "monitor," or "observe"; and "mayya," which translates to "water" - he speculates the name refers to a guardian of water. Less credited resources attributed the name to other sources:
 The words Hazmieh may come from the Arabic root "Hazm", which means "corral," because it was a meeting point for caravans heading into the mountains.
 It refers to an unknown prince named Hazem
 It has Syriac roots from two words: "Haza," meaning deep; and "Mayya," meaning water, since there are springs in the vicinity.

Notable people

Élias Sarkis, former Lebanese president

Sabah, singer and actress

Samira Tewfik, singer

Wadih El Safi, singer and actor

Walid Toufic, singer

References

External links
Hazmiyeh (Baabda)

Populated places in Baabda District
Greater Beirut